The outcomes paradox is one of the terms for the observation that patients with schizophrenia in developing countries benefit much more from therapy than those in Western countries. This is surprising because the reverse holds for most diseases: "the richer and more developed the country, the better the patient outcome". 

The outcomes paradox came to light in late 60s due to studies done by World Health Organization across the world and has become an "axiom" in international psychiatry since. In a study in India, it was revealed that the better outcome among patients is due to socio-cultural factors such as family, community, and local conditions. For this reason, related WHO programmes in India are community- and family-based. 

Cohen et al. criticize this view, and argue that the data do not support this conclusion. There is also a concept called "equivalent outcome paradox", which describes the condition where varying methods of psychotherapy based on different techniques and theoretical orientations tend to produce the same outcome.

See also 
 List of paradoxes
 Schizophrenia

References 

Paradoxes
Schizophrenia
Psychotherapy